Opuntia abjecta is a short cactus, perhaps to 15(25) cm tall. It occurs in the Florida Keys and has been conflated with O. triacantha. Recent work shows that the two taxa are distinct. In addition to morphological and phylogenetic (DNA) differences, O. triacantha occurs in Cuba, whereas O. abjecta occurs in Florida. Currently It is Listed as critically by the IUCN Red List.

Details
O. abjecta grows on humus over limestone or even on bare limestone. Cladodes are typically 2.5 cm long by 4–5 cm long. The cladodes do not shatter, but do deattach from each other with some ease. O. abjecta is a small plant with radiating branches, a subshrub. Retrorsely barbed spines are reddish-brown as they develop; they mature to pale white (not bright white). Zero to three spines are produced by terminal cladodes. Generally, the spines of O. abjecta are shorter than 4 cm. The flower bud of O. ajbjecta is rounded (not acute). O. abjecta has teardrop-shaped leaves. The seeds are about 4 mm in diameter.

References

External links
Opuntia abjecta original description, retrieved June 27, 2017
Opuntia abjecta photo gallery at Opuntia Web

abjecta